WODK-LD (channel 45) is a low-power television station in St. Louis, Missouri, United States, affiliated with the Spanish-language Telemundo network. It is owned by Innovate Corp. alongside KPTN-LD and KBGU-LD. WODK-LD's transmitter is located near Shrewsbury, Missouri.

History 
The station's construction permit was issued by the Federal Communications Commission (FCC) on February 25, 2010, under the calls of W45DK-D. At that time, the station was originally licensed to Springfield, Illinois. The current WODK-LD callsign was adopted on March 28, 2016.

DTV America relocated the station to the St. Louis area in late 2016, although it was not licensed to serve St. Louis until January 5, 2021. It then signed on in December 2016 as the area's Cozi TV affiliate. By January 2017, the station has been broadcasting seven subchannels, including bringing Decades, Heroes & Icons, the American Sports Network, Tuff TV, and AMGTV to the St. Louis market. With that, a total of 14 subchannels are offered over both of DTV America-owned stations in St. Louis, including those of sister station KBGU-LP. At the start of 2018, WODK-LD lost its H&I, Decades and Movies! subchannels; the owner of those networks, Weigel Broadcasting, purchased KNLC (channel 24) in December 2017, and took control of the local rights to those networks unilaterally, replacing WODK-LD.

Technical information

Subchannels
The station's digital signal is multiplexed:

References 

Low-power television stations in the United States
Innovate Corp.
Telemundo network affiliates
2016 establishments in Missouri
Television channels and stations established in 2016
Television stations in St. Louis